RPN Kampong Mentiri is a public housing estate near the village Kampong Mentiri in Brunei-Muara District, Brunei.

Administration 
For administrative purposes the area has been divided into, and established as, two village subdivisions:

Both are villages within Mukim Mentiri.

Infrastructure

Schools 
 Pehin Datu Seri Maharaja Secondary School, which provides secondary education for the residents of the mukim of Mentiri
 Dato Mohd Yassin Primary School
 Dato Mohd Yassin Religious School

Mosque 
Hassanal Bolkiah Mosque was opened in 2017 and it replaces the former Kampong Mentiri National Housing Scheme Mosque which was destroyed in a fire. The mosque was inaugurated by Sultan Hassanal Bolkiah, the Sultan of Brunei; it can accommodate 3,000 worshippers.

See also 
 Public housing in Brunei

References 

Mentiri, RPN